The Ortoire River is a river in Trinidad and Tobago.  It forms the boundary between Nariva County and Mayaro County in east Trinidad.

It is green in color and it once had an iron bridge with wooden planks but it has been replaced by an all paved concrete bridge; also it was made higher to reduce flooding. The river is famous for a bioluminescent blueish glow that is occasionally emitted by living organisms in the water.

References 

Rivers of Trinidad and Tobago
Trinidad (island)